WSVL-LP (channel 48) is a defunct low-powered television station licensed and located in Keysville, Virginia.

History
The station signed on December 9, 1991 as W48BL and then changed it calls to WSVL on February 21, 2000. WSVL was a sister station to WFLV-LP (now defunct) and WKYV-LP (now WZTD-LD, a Telemundo network affiliate) but it remains a sister station to WFMA-LP, channel 52 in Farmville, Virginia.

The station was silent and its license remained active until it was surrendered to the Federal Communications Commission (FCC) on October 27, 2010. The FCC cancelled the license and deleted the call sign from its database.

External links

SVL-LP
Television channels and stations established in 1991
Defunct television stations in the United States
Television channels and stations disestablished in 2010
1991 establishments in Virginia
2010 disestablishments in Virginia
SVL-LP